Margaret Morgan may refer to:

 Margaret Morgan (slave), black woman claimed as a slave, in a case that led to the Supreme Court of the United States trial of Prigg v. Pennsylvania
 Margaret Mary Morgan (died 1946), American suffragist, politician and child welfare advocate